Mass Suicide Occult Figurines is the debut album by John Vanderslice, released in 2000. It is named after a line in Neutral Milk Hotel's "Song Against Sex".

Reception 
In anticipation of Vanderslice's fourth album Cellar Door, CMJ New Music Monthlys Louis Miller described the album as "a perfectly disjointed pop album." Exclaim! wrote that "Vanderslice uses a mix of traditional rock instrumentation spiced with the occasional strings to bring his pop visions to life."

Track listing

References 

2000 debut albums
John Vanderslice albums